The 1916 Abingdon by-election, was a parliamentary by-election held for the House of Commons constituency of Abingdon on 29 August 1916.

Vacancy
The by-election was caused by the resignation of the Conservative MP Harold Henderson who had held the seat since winning it in the January 1910 general election. Henderson had resigned on his appointment as military secretary to the Duke of Devonshire who was to become Governor General of Canada in November 1916.

Candidates
The former Member of Parliament, Archie Loyd, who had represented Abingdon from 1895 to 1906, stood unopposed as the Conservative candidate.

The result
Loyd was returned unopposed.

References

See also
List of United Kingdom by-elections
United Kingdom by-election records

Unopposed by-elections to the Parliament of the United Kingdom in English constituencies
1916 elections in the United Kingdom
1916 in England
By-elections to the Parliament of the United Kingdom in Berkshire constituencies
Abingdon-on-Thames
By-elections to the Parliament of the United Kingdom in Oxfordshire constituencies
20th century in Berkshire
August 1916 events